Beica Airport is an airport in Beica (or Begi), Ethiopia . Located at an elevation of 1649 meters above sea level, this airport has one unpaved runway 1331 meters long. As of 2009, it is abandoned.

References

External links 
Ethiopian Airlines Routes

Airports in Ethiopia
Oromia Region